Marine Drugs is a peer-reviewed open-access medical journal publishing reviews and regular research papers on the research, development, and production of therapeutic agents from marine natural products. It is published by MDPI and was established in 2003. The editor-in-chief is Prof. Bill Baker.

Abstracting and indexing 
The journal is abstracted and indexed in:

According to the Journal Citation Reports, the journal has a 2017 impact factor of 4.379.

References

External links 
 

Open access journals
Pharmacology journals
Monthly journals
English-language journals
Publications established in 2003
MDPI academic journals